St. Luke Building is a historic office building located in Richmond, Virginia. Built in 1902–1903, the St. Luke Building is located on a lot in the southeast corner of a block defined by St. James Street to the east, West Baker Street to the south, St. John Street to the west, and West Charity Street to the north. From the headquarters building, Maggie L. Walker oversaw operations of the Independent Order of St. Luke.  Founded in 1869, the Order's mission to foster African-American economic independence was largely realized under the leadership of trailblazing African American businesswoman Maggie Lena Walker through enterprises housed in the St. Luke Building.  The building also housed the St. Luke Herald newspaper, the St. Luke Educational Fund, the St. Luke Penny Savings Bank, and the St. Luke Emporium.  Walker was the first African American woman to found a bank in U.S. history, and she leveraged her entrepreneurial success to advocate for African Americans’ civil rights.  The office of  Maggie L. Walker has been preserved as it was at the time of her death in 1934.

The building was first listed on the National Register of Historic Places in 1982.

Construction 
The building, the oldest black-affiliated office building in Richmond, was built in 1902 and designed by architect John H. White.  The new building's completion was heralded with a week-long series of dedication ceremonies beginning on July 6, 1903. Increased inflation during World War I, however, led the Order to abandon plans for a new building in favor of renovations and additions to the existing St. Luke Building. The 1915 building expansion was designed by Professor Charles Thaddeus Russell of Virginia Union University, with Henry J. Moore serving as contractor for the project.

The varied uses of the office space included Walker's private office, accounting, correspondence, printing, and stenography, among others, and a linotype machine was located in the basement. Other updates included remodeling and increasing the capacity of the heating equipment, installation of gas outlets at each floor, updating and expanding electrical wiring, and installation of new restrooms at each floor. The total cost of the St. Luke Building modifications was just short of $100,000, two-thirds of the projected $150,000 cost of a new building. Walker noted that approximately 300 individuals worked on the building, half of whom were African American, including the largest sub-contractor, Thomas R. Davis.

The setting for this property was dramatically changed during the mid-20th century when construction of the Richmond-Petersburg Turnpike (present-day Interstates 95 and 64) was constructed a short distance to the south, separating the St. Luke Building from the heart of the Jackson Ward neighborhood (which was designated NRHP 1976 and NHL in 1978).

Architecture

Exterior design 

The St. Luke Building is a handsome example of the Classical Revival style. The building's east (primary elevation) exterior walls are built of a pressed, beige brick, with the 1902-1903 and 1918 brick being slightly different colors. On the first floor of the east elevation, the storefront consists of four wood-frame, single-fixed pane storefront windows topped by transoms. The storefront windows were modified several times, with the most recent modification in the 1970s. The south elevation is constructed of yellow brick (similar, but not identical to the beige brick on the original portion of the building), with each bay and story defined by brick pilasters and brick string courses. The west (rear) elevation is constructed of red brick and has a stepped parapet that is higher at the south end. The north elevation is constructed of red brick. The first two stories are obscured at the east end by the adjoining building. Fenestration throughout consists of two-over-two wood sash with transoms and one-over-one wood sash of varying sizes, with one window in each bay of each story, except the easternmost bay. All windows are contained within segmental-arched openings, have stone sills, and are typically either partially or fully boarded up.

A metal-wrapped wood cornice tops the east (primary) elevation. Signage consisting of letters spelling “St Luke Building” is attached to the masonry walls between the second- and third-story windows of the east elevation. The building is covered by a flat membrane roof that slopes down from south to north. The north end of the roof has a stepped, red brick parapet and the south end has a flat brick parapet. Both parapets are partially coated with concrete. There are four brick interior chimneys: one at the southwest corner of the roof, and three along the north elevation. An elevator overrun is located in the southeast corner of the roof and the roof access is located just west of the overrun along the south elevation.

On the east (primary) elevation all four entries contain double wood-framed doors with transoms. The main entrance in the southernmost bay contains a flat, steel-framed, wood-clad, suspended entry canopy. On the south elevation, a bricked-up, canopied entry is located in the second bay from the west and appears similar to that of the front (east) elevation. The entry has a short flight of concrete steps with a metal rail. A narrow basement areaway, accessed by a flight of concrete steps with a metal rail, runs the width of the elevation. The west (rear) elevation doors, located in the second and third bays from the north, each contain a modern metal door. The southernmost door has an exterior metal vestibule accessed by a concrete ramp. Each door took the place of a window, the former openings for which are bricked up above each door.

An exterior metal stair with a corrugated metal canopy leads from a second-story door to the south side of the building. The second-story door is metal, and has a boarded-up window and a large, segmental-arched, boarded-up transom. On the north elevation, metal fire escape stairs descend diagonally from approximately the center of the fourth story to the west end of the second story. The fire escape is a later addition, as evidenced by three former window openings that have been modified into door openings with transoms at each level. Each opening contains a set of narrow wood double doors, each leaf of which contains one light over one panel. The fourth-story door has a nine-light transom, the third-story a six-light, and the second-story a twelve-light. The second-story door is blocked at the interior by a fixed wood panel, which also covers broken glass at the doors. A basement is located under the 1918 addition and the southeast corner of the original building; the rest of the space consists of crawlspace only. The basement contains three rooms, including a furnace room at the west end, a hall with stair at the east end, and a vault behind the stair. An elevator is located behind the vault. Typical finishes include concrete floors, plaster or exposed brick walls, and plaster or poured-in-place concrete ceilings. Plumbing is exposed throughout much of the basement, and is mostly concentrated in the furnace room, where there is a water heater and other mechanical equipment.

Interior design 

The ground floor originally housed shops that were accessed from St. James Street. The current configuration, modified most recently in the 1970s, consists of four rooms that are accessed by an entry hall that is open except for two stair halls flanking the elevator shaft and a restroom at the west (rear) end. A short flight of stairs (dating to the 1970s modification) leads from the 1902-1903 section to the 1918 addition near the east end of the building. Floor finishes include small ceramic tiles and vinyl composition tile (VCT) laid over wood strip flooring. A concrete ramp, also dating to the 1970s, connects the 1902-1903 section to the 1918 addition. The hallway at the base of the southeast stair has a painted, coffered wood ceiling; the remaining ceilings are typically plaster covered with later gypsum board. The original large, arched opening at the south wall of the northwest room is now infilled with gypsum board with a modern door. Metal doors, dating to the 1970s, access two separate rooms along the west wall.

The second floor of the building consists of seven rooms accessed by a hallway containing two sets of stairs along the south wall flanking the elevator shaft. The two stairs are currently divided by a modern gypsum board fire wall. A restroom is located at the west (rear) end of the hallway. The original wood strip floors are covered with VCT throughout. The 1902-1903 section has a pressed tin ceiling that is divided at intervals by large structural beams and extends to form a crown molding at both the walls and the beams. The framework for a suspended acoustical tile ceiling is found in most rooms. The exterior walls are of plaster and all interior partition walls are of modern gypsum board, with interior walls finished with either bead board (historic) or particle board (non-historic) wainscoting. At the west wall, some window openings were bricked in and replaced with the existing, smaller windows.

The third floor of the building consists of seven rooms accessed by a hallway containing two sets of stairs along the south wall flanking the elevator shaft. The two stairs are currently divided by a modern gypsum board fire wall. A restroom is located at the west (rear) end of the hallway. The ceilings are of plaster that, in some of the rooms of the 1902-1903 section, has been damaged, exposing underlying wood lath. The plaster ceilings are typically covered with modern gypsum board, large sections of which are damaged or missing. The plaster walls of the 1902-1903 section's southeast and southwest rooms are covered with painted, faux wood paneling.

The fourth floor of the building consists of large open area that formerly housed the insurance society, accessed by a hallway containing two sets of stairs along the south wall flanking the elevator shaft. The two stairs are currently divided by a modern gypsum-board fire wall. A restroom is located at the west (rear) end of the hallway. The former insurance area is a large, open space with low, modern gypsum-board partition walls enclosing offices along the east and north walls. The outer walls of this section are of plaster with a bead board wainscot. Ca.1918 paneled wood partition walls form a room at the southwest corner. Four-light, pivoted transom windows are placed continuously along these paneled partition walls. The south wall features two storefront windows with painted glazing, fluted pilasters, a dentil cornice, and multi-light transom windows with painted glazing. Toward the west end of the same wall is a doorway, missing its door, with a surround in the same style as the teller area. The ceilings are finished with pressed tin that, as with the second-floor ceiling, extends to form a crown molding. A central structural beam supported by five square wood columns runs east–west at the ceiling of the original section and is also covered with tin. A paneled wood teller's cage with metal cage doors is located near the southeast corner of the 1902-1903 section and is original to the building. It adjoins the south wall, where a teller counter opens to the south 1918 section. Another teller counter opens to the north.

National significance 

St Luke Building was the headquarters for the Independent Order of St. Luke, one of the largest black fraternal orders in the United States. The Order peaked during the 1920s with over 100,000 members in 24 states. In addition to being large compared to other fraternal orders, the Order's membership also matched that of the NAACP civil rights advocacy organization during the same time period. The Order was unique as the only national black fraternal order run by a woman and composed primarily of women.

The St. Luke Building not only housed the Order's activities, the building itself became central to the organization's national brand. Images of the building appeared on advertisements in African American newspapers across the country, as well as on promotional materials known to have circulated locally. As an organization that provided insurance to its members, it was important that the Order marketed itself as being financially secure, and the headquarters building became the physical representation of the organization's solidity, with a value of over $100,000 by 1920. Walker also arranged for the St. Luke Building to host the Order's annual conventions when they were held in Richmond. In the end, the headquarters building's size, appearance, and value successfully made the case that the Order was worthy of membership and sound for investments.

The St. Luke Building is nationally significant because it is the actual building that housed the nation's first bank that was chartered by an African American woman.

References

External links 

Byrd, Odell R., Jr. Black History Concise and Condensed: A History of Black Richmond. Richmond, VA: Tambuzi Publication, 1994.

Green, Bryan Clark, Calder Loth, and William M.S. Rasmussen, Lost Virginia: Vanished Architecture of the Old Dominion. Charlottesville: Howell Press for the Virginia Historical Society, 2001

Loth, Calder. Virginia Landmarks of Black History. Charlottesville, VA: University Press of Virginia, 1995.

Scott, Mary Wingfield. Old Richmond Neighborhoods. Richmond, VA: William Byrd Press, Inc., 1984.

African-American history in Richmond, Virginia
Commercial buildings on the National Register of Historic Places in Virginia
Commercial buildings completed in 1902
Buildings and structures in Richmond, Virginia
National Register of Historic Places in Richmond, Virginia